Kaba Diawara (born 16 December 1975) is a football manager and former player who played as a striker. He has been head coach of the Guinea national football team since October 2021.

Diawara played for French teams Sporting Toulon, Bordeaux, Rennes, Olympique de Marseille, Nice, Paris Saint-Germain, and Arles-Avignon, for English clubs Blackburn Rovers, West Ham United and Arsenal and for clubs in Spain and Turkey. Diawara was born in France and represented the country at under-21 level before playing senior international football for Guinea.

Club career

Beginnings in France
Born in Toulon, Diawara at first played in 1993 for Toulon and then journeyed to Bordeaux a year later. With Bordeaux he played in the 1997 Coupe de la Ligue Final. After six years at the club he moved to Premier League club Arsenal in January 1999. Six months after he left Bordeaux they won the 1999 Ligue 1 title.

Premier League
He made his debut for Arsenal on 31 January 1999 in a league match against Chelsea. He went on to make 15 appearances for Arsenal, 12 of which were in the league, but failed to score as Arsenal were involved in an ultimately unsuccessful title race with Manchester United.

Return to France
During the summer of 1999 Diawara returned to France and signed for Marseille. He stayed at Marseille for six months and in January 2000 he signed for club rival Paris St Germain with whom he played in the 2000 Coupe de la Ligue Final.

Return to England
In the summer of 2000 he was linked with a return to England with Premier League side Everton, however they re-signed Duncan Ferguson instead. However he did return to England when in August 2000 he joined Division One side Blackburn Rovers on loan. At Blackburn he scored his first and only goal in English football, in a League Cup tie with Rochdale. After his loan at Blackburn finished he then joined Premier League side West Ham United on loan for the rest of the 2000-01 season.

Later career
After returning to Paris St Germain he had further loan spells at Racing de Ferrol and Nice.

In the 2006–07 season, he transferred to Süper Lig team Gaziantepspor. At Gaziantepspor he got little playing time. As such in January 2008 he signed a six-month contract with fellow Turkish side Ankaragücü. In August 2008, he moved to Alki Larnaca of Cyprus. He was eventually released by Larnaca in December of that year. Diawara then signed for French side AC Arles-Avignon on a free transfer in 2009. At Avignon Diawara went on to bring an end to his playing days.

International career 
Diawara played for the French national U-21 team, but chose to represent Guinea at senior level. Diawara was then called up to Guinea's squad for the 2006 African Cup of Nations. Guinea went on to the quarterfinals of the tournament against where Diawara scored in an eventual 3–2 defeat to Senegal.

Coaching career 
In October 2021, Diawara was named as head coach of the Guinea national football team, replacing former French international Didier Six.

Personal life
After retirement, Diawara became a football pundit with French network Canal +.

Honours
Bordeaux
Ligue 1: 1998–99
Coupe de la Ligue runner-up: 1996–97

Paris Saint-Germain
Coupe de la Ligue runner-up: 1999–2000

References

External links
 
 
 
 Profile at sporting-heroes.net
 
 

1975 births
Living people
Sportspeople from Toulon
Association football forwards
France under-21 international footballers
Citizens of Guinea through descent
Guinean footballers
French footballers
Guinea international footballers
Guinean expatriate footballers
Guinean expatriate sportspeople in France
Expatriate footballers in France
SC Toulon players
Ligue 1 players
Ligue 2 players
FC Girondins de Bordeaux players
Stade Rennais F.C. players
Expatriate footballers in England
Premier League players
Arsenal F.C. players
Olympique de Marseille players
Paris Saint-Germain F.C. players
Blackburn Rovers F.C. players
West Ham United F.C. players
Expatriate footballers in Spain
Racing de Ferrol footballers
OGC Nice players
Expatriate footballers in Qatar
Al-Gharafa SC players
Al Kharaitiyat SC players
AC Ajaccio players
Guinean expatriate sportspeople in Turkey
Expatriate footballers in Turkey
Süper Lig players
Gaziantepspor footballers
MKE Ankaragücü footballers
Expatriate footballers in Cyprus
Cypriot First Division players
Alki Larnaca FC players
French sportspeople of Guinean descent
Qatar Stars League players
2006 Africa Cup of Nations players
Guinea national football team managers
Footballers from Provence-Alpes-Côte d'Azur
Black French sportspeople